Carol F. Justus (March 21, 1940 – August 1, 2007) was an American linguist who specialized in Indo-European linguistics.

Biography
Carol F. Justus was born on March 21, 1940, in Lodi, Ohio. She gained an A.B. in French in 1960 at King College, and an M.A. in Linguistics & Comparative Philology at the University of Minnesota in 1966. From 1967 to 1969 she studied at the Institute for Assyriology and Hittitology at the Ludwig Maximilian University of Munich. Justus received a Ph.D. in Indo-European linguistics at the University of Texas at Austin in 1973 under the supervision of Edgar C. Polomé. She was Assistant Professor (1973-1976) and Associate Professor (1976-1977) of Linguistics at State University of New York (1973-1976). From 1982 to 1985 she was a research associate at the Linguistics Research Center at UT Austin, and then Associate Professor of Linguistics at San Jose State University 1989 to 1994.

Since 1995, Justus served as Adjunct Associate Professor of Classics and Middle Eastern studies at the Classics Department at the University of Texas at Austin. At Austin, Justus taught Indo-European studies, among other subjects. She was the author of more than 30 scholarly works. Justus served on the editorial board of the Journal of Indo-European Studies and as general editor of General Linguistics.

Justus died in Austin, Texas on August 1, 2007.

Selected works

See also
 Bridget Drinka
 Joe Salmons
 Winfred P. Lehmann

Sources

1940 births
2007 deaths
Classical scholars of the University of Texas at Austin
Linguists of Indo-European languages
Indo-Europeanists
University of Minnesota alumni
University of Texas at Austin alumni
University of Texas at Austin faculty